Anuta Paina is an island in the Solomon Islands. It is located in Malaita Province, to the east of Malaita.

References

Islands of the Solomon Islands